August Eigruber (16 April 1907 – 28 May 1947) was an Austrian-born Nazi Gauleiter and Reichsstatthalter of Reichsgau Oberdonau (Upper Danube) and Landeshauptmann of Upper Austria. He was convicted of war crimes at Mauthausen-Gusen concentration camp and hanged.

Early life and Nazi career
Born in Steyr, Austria, after finishing middle school, Eigruber underwent training in geodesy and fine mechanics at the Austrian Federal Teaching Institution for Iron- and Steelworking. Thereafter, he was active in his profession. In November 1922 he joined the National Socialist Worker Youth of Austria, whose leader he became in 1925. In April 1928, he joined the Nazi Party, whose Steyr-Land district leadership he took up in October 1930. For his activities in the NSDAP, which was banned in Austria, Eigruber was sentenced to several months in prison. From May 1935, Eigruber was the Gau Director (Gaugeschäftsführer) for the banned Party in the Upper Austria Gau, and he took over complete leadership of the Gau as of 1936.

Rise to power in Nazi state
After the Anschluss, he was appointed Landeshauptmann of Upper Austria on 14 March 1938. On 10 April he was elected as a member of the German Reichstag, representing Austria. On 1 June 1938, Eigruber joined the SA, with the rank of SA-Brigadeführer effective 12 March. On 25 July, he also joined the SS as a Standartenführer also with an effective date of 12 March. On 22 May Adolf Hitler appointed him Gauleiter of Reichsgau Oberdonau. He thus united under his control the highest party and governmental offices in his jurisdiction.
 
In September 1938, Gauleiter Eigruber attended the Reichsparteitag in Nuremberg. When Passau Nazis met at the Deutschmeister Inn, Eigruber joined his allies and reminisced about their venture during the Kampfjahre.

He rose to the rank of SS-Brigadeführer in January 1939 and to SS-Gruppenführer in November 1940. On 1 April 1940, he was installed as Reichsstatthalter (Reich Governor) of Oberdonau. In July 1940, the Donau-Zeitung announced that August Eigruber would travel to Passau by ship. There, he would be ceremonially welcomed at City Hall, and attend the latest play by Hans Baumann. On 16 November 1942 came his appointment as Reich Defense Commissioner (Reichsverteidigungskommissar) for his Gau. On 21 June 1943, Eigruber was promoted to the rank of SS-Obergruppenführer. He was also made an SA-Obergruppenführer on 9 November 1943. 

Toward the end of the war, as US forces approached his capital at Linz, he proclaimed the city a "fortress" to be defended to the bitter end. However, shortly after the beginning of the offensive on 5 May 1945, he fled and proclaimed Linz an open city. He managed to hide out using forged identification papers until 11 August 1945, but was arrested by US Army Counterintelligence, in Sankt Pankraz (a few miles south of Kirchdorf an der Krems).

Conviction and execution
At the Mauthausen-Gusen camp trials, held under the jurisdiction of the Dachau International Military Tribunal, he was sentenced to death by hanging on 13 May 1946 for his responsibility for crimes at Mauthausen concentration camp, where tens of thousands of prisoners died. The sentence was carried out in the prison yard at Landsberg Prison on 28 May 1947. Eigruber's last words were "Lord, take care of Germany. Lord, take care of my family. Lord, take care of my children. I regard it as an honor to be hanged by the most brutal of victors. Long live Germany!"

Decorations and awards
Anschluss Medal, c.1938
Sudetenland Medal, 1939
Honour Chevron for the Old Guard, 25.5.1938
Golden Party Badge, 30.1.1939
Clasp to the Sudetenland Medal, 1939
NSDAP Long Service Award in Bronze, Silver and Gold, 1940-1942

References

Bibliography
 Florian Freund: Der Mauthausen-Prozeß, in: Dachauer Hefte 13 - Gericht und Gerechtigkeit;  Hrsg.: Comité International de Dachau, Brüssel 1997
 Ernst Klee: Das Personenlexikon zum Dritten Reich: Wer war was vor und nach 1945. Fischer-Taschenbuch-Verlag, Frankfurt am Main 2007, .
 

 Erich Stockhorst: 5000 Köpfe – Wer war was im Dritten Reich. Arndt, Kiel 2000, .

1907 births
1947 deaths
Holocaust perpetrators in Austria
Gauleiters
Executed Austrian Nazis
Members of the Reichstag of Nazi Germany
Mauthausen Trial executions
People from Steyr
Prisoners and detainees of Austria
Sturmabteilung officers
SS-Obergruppenführer
Governors of Upper Austria
Heads of government who were later imprisoned
Heads of government convicted of war crimes
Executed mass murderers